Jean Beagle Ristaino is an American scientist and  William Neal Reynolds Distinguished Professor of Plant Pathology.  She is best known for her work on the epidemiology and population genetics of Oomycete plant pathogens in the genus Phytophthora and her work on the population genomics of historic  outbreaks of the  Irish famine pathogen, Phytophthora infestans

Biography
Ristaino received her B.S. degree in biological sciences in 1978 and her M.S. degree in plant pathology in 1982 from the University of Maryland.  She received her Ph.D. from the University of California, Davis in 1987.  Since 1987, Ristaino has been on the faculty of North Carolina State University, and she currently holds the rank of  William Neal Reynolds Distinguished Professor.

In 2012, Ristaino served as a Jefferson Science Fellow in the Bureau for Food Security of the United States Agency for International Development].  In 2016, she received the Excellence in International Service Award from the American Phytopathological Society  In 2019 she was awarded the Global Engagement Award from NC State University. 
 
Ristaino serves as the director of the “Emerging Plant Disease and Global Food Security” cluster at NC State, has served as a Jefferson Science Fellow for the US Department of State and received a Fulbright European Research Scholar Award to work with the University of Catania on late blight in Italy in 2018. In August 2020 , she was elected a Fellow of the American Phytopathological Society and named a AAAS Fellow in November, 2020.

Ristaino's lab at NC State works on emerging plant diseases that threaten global food security.  A major focus of research is to understand the factors that contribute to disease emergence including the epidemiology and population genetics of Oomycete plant pathogens in the genus Phytophthora. Phytophthora infestans caused the Great Famine of Ireland in the 1840s, and is a reemerging threat to global food security. She studies the population genetics and migrations of both historic and present day strains of the pathogen. Her lab was part of a multi-investigator group that sequenced the genome of the pathogen. She is now using the genome sequence to develop novel strategies for managing disease in the field. Her team has developed a web portal called USAblight.org that can be used to track recent outbreaks of disease using geospatial analytics. She also works on other pathogens of tropical crop plants including black Sigatoka on banana, downy mildew of tobacco, soilborne fungi and coffee rust that are threats to global food security.

Honors and Awards
 Named American Phytopathological Society Fellow, Denver APS, 2020
 NC State University Global Engagement Award, 2019.
 US – Italy Fulbright Research Scholar Award, US Department of State, University of Catania, Jan-July, 2018
 Director, Emerging Plant Disease and Global Food Security Cluster, NC State University, March 2015.
 American Phytopathological Society Excellence in International Service Award, August 2016
 Bellagio Conference Award, Rockefeller Foundation, April 2014
 Jefferson Science Fellow and Senior Science Advisor, US State Department, USAID Bureau for Food Security, August 2012 to present.
 Named a William Neal Reynolds Distinguished Professor, January 2012.
 “Mini” sabbatical leave with Joe Heitman, Duke University, Fall 2011.
 Select for the National Academy of Sciences Keck Futures Initiative (NAKFI) conference on  “Ecosystems Services: Charting a Path to Sustainability Conference”, Nov. 10-13, 2011, Irvine CA.  Interdisciplinary Research Ream Member: Design production systems for ecosystem services that improve human outcomes related to food and nutrition.
 Late blight research on historical specimens in Newspapers: London Times, The New York Times, The Daily Telegraph, The Washington Post, San Francisco Chronicle, The Boston Globe, The News and Observer,  NY Academy of Sciences, Capital Press, The Chronicle of Higher Education, Sunday Times London Higher Education Supplement, Global Initiative on Late blight Newsletter, Plant Pathology Newsletter, CALS Perspective Newsletter; Magazines: National Geographic, U.S. News & World Report, Time magazine, The Sciences magazine, Smithsonian. Radio: National Public Radio – Richard Harris, All Things Considered; Todd Mundt Show; BBC Radio-Belfast, London, Edinburgh, Voice of America,  Television:  NC State Focus, TV Interview; CNN International; WRAL TV News;  Websites -Yahoo, CNN Science Daily, ABC News; Elsevier Science, The New Scientist, National Sigma Xi News briefs, Science -In-The- News, The Agricultural Research Service Website, The World Potato Congress, Homepage at North Carolina State University, ProMed - Program for Monitoring Emerging Diseases, Daily University Science News, Perkin Elmer - Online Magazine Biobeat.  (See summary page 20)
 CNN Global Challenges Program filmed in my lab, fall, 2002.
 Invited to speak at International Congress of Plant Pathology (ICPP): 2017- Boston; Beijing, 2013;  Christchurch, NZ, 2003; Edinburgh, Scotland, 1998.
 AAAS Science Fellow delegation to Switzerland, October 2002.  Worked with Swiss Embassy and presented a talk to Swiss parliament on “How Universities Foster Science Innovation”.
 US Patent number 5,780,271 entitled "PCR assays for Phytophthora species".  Awarded July 14, 1998.  Awarded Patent Plaque at Inventors Luncheon, May 17, 1999.  DH Hill Special Exhibit, Patents at NCSU, May 1, 2000.
 Sabbatical leave, Farlow Herbarium, Harvard University, Royal Botanic Gardens, Kew, England. Sept. 1997-Feb. 1998.  
 ESCOP/ACOP Leadership Intern, 1997-1998, College of Agriculture and Life Sciences, N.C. State University.
 American Association for the Advancement of Science Summer Science and Engineering Fellow.  Office of Air and Radiation, Development of Ecologically-based Alternatives to Methyl Bromide, Environmental Protection Agency, Wash. DC, June 3-Aug. 9, 1996. 
 Awarded 1993 Sigma Xi Outstanding Young Researcher Award, North Carolina State University Chapter of Sigma Xi, April 1993.  College of Agriculture and Life Sciences Awards Recognition Reception for Young Researcher Award, October 1994. 
 Received the Dennis Hall, Outstanding Graduate Student Award, Department of Plant Pathology, University of California, Davis, 1988.
 Received Jastro Shields Graduate Research Scholarship, Univ. California, Davis, 1985.
 Southern Soybean Disease Workers Conference, Graduate Student Award, March 1981.
 Valedictorian, Parkdale High School, Riverdale, MD, June 1975.

External links

 Ristaino lab

Living people
University System of Maryland alumni
University of California, Davis alumni
North Carolina State University faculty
Jefferson Science Fellows
Year of birth missing (living people)